Brothers is a 1977 American drama film directed by Arthur Barron and produced by Edward Lewis and Mildred Lewis. It stars Bernie Casey, Vonetta McGee, Ron O'Neal, John Lehne, Stu Gilliam, Renny Roker, Owen Pace, Dwan Smith and Martin St. Judge in the lead roles. 

The film parallels the real life stories of Black radicals Angela Davis, George Jackson, and Jonathan Jackson. 

This film's music is composed by Taj Mahal.

Plot summary
The film begins with the events surrounding the arrest and conviction of David Thomas on trumped up charges of armed robbery. He is sentenced to "one year to life" in prison. He is soon sent to Mendocino Prison, a facility described as "our number one concentration camp for Black" by David's brother, Josh. 

In prison David is subjected to overt racism, violence, and mistreatment by guards and the administration. His cellmate, Walter Nance, provides David with a radical political education. Soon David starts organizing prisoners to fight back against the racist oppression. He starts a clandestine newsletter which is distributed and read by Black prisoners.  

At the same time, Josh is working on supporting his brother in prison. Josh goes to visit Paula Jones, a revolutionary Black professor. As a result of Josh's entreaties Paula begins reading David's writings and the two begin correspondence. Paula begins to mobilize support for the brothers in Mendocino. She also begins to fall in love with David. 

After a guard murders of one of the Black prisoners, the prisoners rebel. During the rebellion a guard is thrown to his death from the prison's third tier. Guards frame David and two other radical Black prisoners for the killing. During a court hearing, Josh pulls out a pistol and takes the prosecuting attorney and judge as hostages. He flees the courthouse and into a van. He is gunned down in the parking lot. In the gunfire the judge and prosecutor are also killed. 

Paula, at the urging of her colleagues, decides to flee and go underground out of fear of prosecution for allegedly aiding and abetting the courthouse actions. She changes her appearance and location but is captured, likely because of a snitch. 

Sometime later, at Mendocino Prison, guards engineer an agent provocateur to pretend to start an armed riot. The guards' plan seems to be to use this as an excuse to assassinate David. David realizes this and attempts to take the situation into his own hands. Tragically, he is gunned down in the prison yard. 

The film ends, rather saccharinely, with all the Mendocino prisoners walking into the chow hall in racially solidarity and sitting together. The racist guards staring slack jawed and afraid.

The plot tracks closely to the real life events from the mid-1960 to early 1970 including the Marin County Civic Center rebellion, the founding of the Black Guerilla Family, the writings of George Jackson including Blood in My Eye and Soledad Brother: The Prison Letters of George Jackson, and the case of the Soledad Brothers.

Cast
 Bernie Casey as David Thomas
 Vonetta McGee as Paula Jones
 Ron O'Neal as Walter Nance
 John Lehne as McGee
 Stu Gilliam as Robinson
 Renny Roker as Lewis
 Owen Pace as Joshua
 Dwan Smith as Kendra
 Martin St. Judge as Williams
 Al Turner as Henry Taylor
 Samantha Harper as Joan Kline
 Carl M. Craig as Jack Browning
 Sam Nudell as Attorney Sirrell
 Jim Swoopes as Sen. Billings
 Dick Yarmy as District Attorney Wayne
 Charles Ricardo Brown as Horton
 Susan Barrister as Tina
 Alphonso Williams as Bill
 Oliver Fletcher as Lacy
 Sidney Galanty as Balaban
 Joseph Havener as Warden
 Cynthia Songé as Staff Girl
 Mercedes Alberti as Female Guard
 John Zaremba
 Robert Cortes

Release
Brothers was released in theatres on August 3, 1977. The film was released on VHS on September 1, 1998 by Warner Home Video.

References

External links
 
 
 
 
 

1970s English-language films
1977 films
1977 drama films
American drama films
Warner Bros. films
1970s American films